Lewers is a surname. Notable people with the surname include:

Benjamin Lewers (1932–2015), English Anglican priest
Iain Lewers (born 1984), British field hockey player
Margo Lewers (1908–1978), Australian artist
Rick Lewers (born 1957/1958), Australian Anglican bishop

See also
Lewer